Eugene Thompson may refer to:
 Flash Thompson (Eugene Thompson), a character appearing in Marvel Comics
 T. Eugene Thompson, American attorney who hired a hit man to kill his wife
 Eugene H. Thompson, member of the New Jersey General Assembly 
 Junior Thompson (Eugene Earl Thompson), American baseball pitcher